The Assassination Bureau Limited (also known as The Assassination Bureau in the United States) is a 1969 British Technicolor black comedy adventure film, produced by Michael Relph, directed by Basil Dearden, and starring Oliver Reed, Diana Rigg, Telly Savalas, and Curd Jürgens. It was released in the U.S. by Paramount Pictures and is based on Jack London's unfinished novel, The Assassination Bureau, Ltd, posthumously published in 1963. Unlike the novel, which is set in the United States, the film is set in Europe.

The Assassination Bureau Limited was the penultimate film of Basil Dearden.

Plot
In London, in 1908, aspiring journalist and women's rights campaigner Sonia Winter (Diana Rigg) uncovers an organisation that specialises in killing for money, the Assassination Bureau Limited. To bring about its destruction, she commissions the assassination of the bureau's own chairman, Ivan Dragomiloff (Oliver Reed) for £20,000 after being bankrolled by her employer, Lord Bostwick.

Far from being outraged or angry, Dragomiloff is amused and delighted and decides to turn the situation to his own advantage. The guiding principle of his bureau, founded by his father, has always been that there was a moral reason why their victims should be killed; these have included despots and tyrants. More recently, though, his elder colleagues have tended to kill more for financial gain than for moral reasons. Dragomiloff, therefore, decides to accept the commission of his own death and challenge the other board members: Kill him or he will kill them!

He meets Miss Winter at the Albert Memorial and with her in tow, Dragomiloff sets off on a tour of Edwardian Europe, challenging and systematically purging the bureau's senior members. Their first stop is Paris where Dragomiloff disguises himself as Le Comte and goes to a brothel. Miss Winters materialises and they hide in a laundry room. The staff outside put a gas pipe into the room, but there is a police raid. They escape down the laundry chute, but leave a booby trap that blows the room up when the door is eventually smashed in, killing Lucoville. Miss Winters is arrested while Dragomiloff sneaks off.

She catches him on a train to Zurich, but Popescu also appears, disguised as a train waiter serving cognac and cigars. He pulls a gun, but Dragomiloff sprays him with fiery brandy, lit by the cigar, burning his face and he jumps off the train and dies. In Zurich the bank manager Weiss pulls a gun on a suspicious-looking customer and throws his bag into the street, thinking it is a bomb. The angry customer leaves, and while Weiss is distracted, Dragomiloff hides a real bomb that kills Weiss.

Next, in Vienna the couple watch a military parade. A man behind them pulls a pistol, but he is trying to assassinate the Archduke watching the parade from a balcony opposite. Dragomiloff disdainfully remarks to Miss Winters that had "The Assassination Bureau" undertaken this "assignment", the Archduke would not remain alive. In Venice Bureau member Cesare Spado dies after being poisoned by his wife; with the help of her lover Angelo she tries to poison Dragomiloff and have Baron Muntzof kill Miss Winters. Dragomiloff not only survives the attempt on his life, but kills both Angelo and Muntzof and rescues Miss Winters. Eleanora Spado tries to blackmail the Assassination Bureau for money by using her knowledge of its existence; the Bureau's response is to have General Pinck kill her with his Luger pistol.

Little do they realise that this is a plot by Miss Winter's sponsor, newspaper publisher Lord Bostwick (Telly Savalas), to take over the bureau, as Bostwick is the bureau's vice-chairman and is bitter for having been passed over in favour of the founder's son. Bostwick and the other surviving members of the Bureau plan to get rich quick by the "biggest killing" of them all, namely buying stocks in arms companies and then propelling Europe into a world war. Their plan is to assassinate all the European heads of state. They attend a secret peace conference where the kings, emperors, and prime ministers of Europe are trying to avoid a possible war over the assassination of a Balkan prince who had accidentally been killed by a bomb intended for Dragomiloff.

Dragomiloff and Miss Winter uncover the plot, which is to drop a large aerial bomb from a hijacked Zeppelin airship directly onto the castle in Ruthenia where the peace conference is being held. Dragomiloff steals aboard the airship and destroys the bomb, while disposing of Lord Bostwick and the remaining members of his board of directors. He exploits General Pinck's one weakness, a sword duel challenge to the death. He is hailed as a hero and later decorated by the heads of state that he has saved. It is implied that Dragomiloff may now wed Miss Winter, since he has been redeemed by his actions.

Cast

Original novel
The film was based on the Jack London novel, The Assassination Bureau. London purchased a storyline from Sinclair Lewis in 1910 and used it as the basis of two short stories and a novel. He was two-thirds of the way through finishing the novel (having written 40,000 words) when he died in 1916. The novel was later completed by Robert L. Fish and finally published in 1963. The New York Times called it "delightfully ridiculous".

Development
Film rights were bought and in May 1966 United Artists announced that Burt Lancaster would star in the film. Lancaster, however, pulled out and film rights reverted to Paramount, where it was made by the team of Basil Dearden and Michael Relph; it was their 25th film together.

Filming
Filming took place in April 1968.

Michael Flint of Paramount later said the film wound up costing a lot of money "because it was decided that it must be a locomotive", namely, a sort of film which "would really carry weight with exhibitors and eventually television networks buying batches of our films, by virtue of stars or production value". He added that in the case of Assassination Bureau "we laboured under the delusion that this could be ensured by spending more on 'production value'".

By February 1969, the film had not been released. According to Diana Rigg, "the film company is stuck with the rather awkward - for America - title and hasn't made up its mind what to do".

Home video
This film was issued on LaserDisc in the mid-1990s. It was also released on VHS at the same time and later on Region 1 DVD.

See also
 Assassinations in fiction

References

External links
 
 
 
 

1969 films
1960s action films
1960s black comedy films
1960s thriller films
British action films
British black comedy films
British thriller films
1960s English-language films
Films about assassinations
Films based on American novels
Films based on works by Jack London
Films directed by Basil Dearden
Films set in the 1900s
Films set in London
Films set in Venice
Paramount Pictures films
Films shot at Pinewood Studios
Films scored by Ron Grainer
Films with screenplays by Michael Relph
Films with screenplays by Wolf Mankowitz
1969 comedy films
1969 drama films
1960s British films